George Arthur Fripp  (13 June 1813 – 17 October 1896) was a British watercolourist. He was a grandson of the artist Nicholas Pocock and brother of the painter Alfred Downing Fripp. His nephew was the artist Henry Charles Innes Fripp.

Life

Fripp was born in Bristol, and educated in Bristol, Birmingham and Leamington. He had lessons in oil painting from James Baker Pyne and first exhibited at the Bristol Society of Artists in 1832. In 1834 he accompanied the Bristol artist William James Müller on a sketching tour of Europe, which produced works he later exhibited at the Royal Academy from 1838.

In 1841, he exhibited at the Old Watercolour Society, becoming an associate that year, a full member in 1845, and secretary from 1848 to 1854. He became well known for his watercolours, mostly scenic British views.

He married Mary Percival in 1846. Two of their twelve children also became artists: Charles Edwin Fripp an artist-reporter for The Graphic, and Thomas W. Fripp, a watercolourist in Canada.

Fripp died in Hampstead, London, in October 1896.

He is buried in the eastern section of Highgate Cemetery in north London. The grave lies in the north-east section close to the vault of his friend Edwin Wilkins Field and the grave of George Eliot, just south of George Holyoake. It is a flat stone slab at ground level and hard to locate in the overgrown areas off the main paths.

References

Francis Greenacre. "Fripp, George Arthur (1813–1896)", (Oxford Dictionary of National Biography, Oxford University Press, 2004 –  accessed 13 June 2007)

Further reading

Thompson, H. Stuart. George A. Fripp and Alfred D. Fripp (London, Walker's Galleries, 1900). Illustrated.
Wilcox, Scott, Newall Christopher. Victorian landscape watercolors (Hudson Hills Pr., 1992) p. 77.
Hargraves, Matthew. Great British watercolors: from the Paul Mellon collection at the Yale (Yale University Press, 2007) p. 85 ff.

Gallery

External links

G A Fripp online (ArtCyclopedia)
G A Fripp biography and paintings (The Fripp & Pocock families of Bristol, England)
George Arthur Fripp  (Government Art Collection)
George Arthur Fripp (Tate Collection)
Penrhyn Castle, view from the Queen's window (1860 watercolour – Royal Collection)
G A Fripp photographs (National Portrait Gallery, London)

19th-century English painters
English male painters
English watercolourists
1813 births
1896 deaths
Burials at Highgate Cemetery
Artists from Bristol
19th-century English male artists